is a Japanese former sprinter who competed in the 1976 Summer Olympics.

References

1948 births
Living people
Japanese male sprinters
Olympic male sprinters
Olympic athletes of Japan
Athletes (track and field) at the 1976 Summer Olympics
Asian Games gold medalists for Japan
Asian Games silver medalists for Japan
Asian Games medalists in athletics (track and field)
Athletes (track and field) at the 1970 Asian Games
Athletes (track and field) at the 1974 Asian Games
Medalists at the 1970 Asian Games
Medalists at the 1974 Asian Games
Japan Championships in Athletics winners
20th-century Japanese people
21st-century Japanese people